Cibdela janthina is a sawfly of the family Argidae.  This species originates from Sumatra in South-East Asia but had also been introduced to La Réunion in 2007 for biological pest control of Rubus alceifolius, a Rosaceae species that had become an invasive species.

It has a metallic dark-blue colour, the males have a length of approx. 8 mm and the females of 9.5 mm.

A parasitoid of C. janthina is Proterops borneoensis.

References 

 Klug, J.C.F. 1834. Übersicht der Tenthredinetae der Sammlung (des Berliner entomologischen Museums). Jahrbücher der Insektenkunde 1: 233–253.

Insects used for control of invasive plants
Argidae
Insects described in 1834